The Polish Men's Volleyball SuperCup is an annual competition for volleyball clubs in Poland played by the PlusLiga champions and Polish Cup winners. It is overseen by the Polish Volleyball Federation and the Professional Volleyball League SA. The tournament was established in 2012 and takes place every year (except 2016) at the beginning of the new PlusLiga season.

Winners

Total titles won

MVP by edition
2012 – 
2013 – 
2014 – 
2015 – 
2017 – 
2018 – 
2019 – 
2020 – 
2021 – 
2022 –

See also
 PlusLiga
 Polish Men's Volleyball Cup

References

External links
 PlusLiga official website 
 Polish Volleyball Federation website 

Volleyball competitions in Poland
2012 establishments in Poland